Church of St. Joseph of the Visitationists commonly known as the Visitationist Church is a Roman Catholic church in Warsaw, Poland, situated at Krakowskie Przedmieście 34.  One of the most notable rococo churches in Poland's capital, its construction was begun in 1664 and completed in 1761.

History

The first wooden church was established in 1651 by Queen Marie Louise Gonzaga de Nevers for the French Order of the Visitation of the Blessed Virgin Mary. This church was burned down by the Swedes during the Deluge in 1656.

In 1664 the Visitationists started to build a new oblong church. The first stone was laid by primate Wacław Leszczyński. This unfinished church burned in 1695. After the fire, the church was restored again. The new foundation was made in 1728 by a stateswoman Elżbieta Sieniawska following the plan of her private architect Karol Antoni Bay. The structural work was finished in 1761. The finishing touch was finally given in 1765.

The church's main claim to fame, in Polish eyes, is that Fryderyk Chopin used to play the church organ here, mainly during services for schoolchildren.

In front of this late-baroque church stands a statue of Cardinal Stefan Wyszyński, primate of Poland from 1948 to 1981.

Interior

The nave with main altar and 6 side chapels in Baroque style are embellished with rich Rococo decorations. There is an impressive and unique pulpit in a shape of boat and also a lot of old sculptures, paintings by old Polish, Italian and French masters (including Saint Louis de Gonzaga by Daniel Schultz), portraits of famous and noble Poles and tabernacle made of ebony and silver. This exceptional tabernacle, which initially was placed in the chapel of Villa Regia Palace in Warsaw, was donated to the church by Queen Marie Louise Gonzaga de Nevers in 1654.

See also

 St Martin's Church
 Church of the Holy Cross
 Field Cathedral of the Polish Army
 St. Florian's Cathedral

References

External links
 Church of St. Joseph in sztuka.net

Church of the Visitation of the Blessed Virgin Mary
17th-century Roman Catholic church buildings in Poland
18th-century Roman Catholic church buildings in Poland
Roman Catholic churches completed in 1761
Rococo architecture in Warsaw
1651 establishments in the Polish–Lithuanian Commonwealth